The Humane Reader and Humane PC are two open-source hardware projects created by research scientist and inventor Braddock Gaskill.

Humane Reader 
The Humane Reader has received coverage from publications including Wired, Make, Engadget, OSNews, Ethiopian Review, and Linux Journal. 

According to Wired, the Human Reader "takes two 8-bit microcontrollers and packages them in a 'classic style console' that connects to a TV. The device includes an optional keyboard, a micro-SD Card reader and a composite video output. It uses a standard micro-USB cellphone charger for power. In all, it can hold the equivalent of 5,000 books, including an offline version of Wikipedia, and requires no internet connection."

Humane PC 
According to Gaskill's website, the Humane PC is an 8-bit microcomputer that "combines the ease of Arduino development with the excitement of a classic stand-alone television-and-keyboard PC."

Wired wrote that "The PC has almost the same specs as the Reader but offers additional features such as a micro-USB port and infrared port."

References

External links 
 Braddock Gaskill's website
 Humane Reader and Humane PC website

Open-source hardware